Brenthia albimaculana is a species of moth of the family Choreutidae. It is found in Indonesia, New Guinea and Australia.

Adults have dark brown wings with white patches.

The larvae are pale yellow and grow to a length of about 6 mm.

References

External links
Australian Insects

Brenthia
Moths of Australia
Moths described in 1875